Thein Maung (January 2, 1891—May 23, 1946) was a Burmese politician and a medical doctor. He was the first Burmese ambassador to Japan and was one of the 21-leader members of the YMBA and the GCBA.

Early life
Thein Maung was born on January 2, 1891, in Paungde, Myanmar. He attended Paungde Government Middle School, Yangon Government High School, and St. Patrick's High School in Mawlamyine. In 1913, he received his B.A from Yangon College. He also received an M.M.F. in medicine from the College of Kolkata.

Career 
In 1923, he served as a member of the Diakite Legislative Council. From 1925–1926 and from 1931–1932, he served as the principal of Myoma National School. In 1934, he became a member of the Indian Legislative Council. While serving as a member, he sought to secede from India and regain the Burmese monastery in Bodh Gaya through the hands of the Hindu monk Mahan. In 1936, he served as a member of the Legislative Council of the United GCBA.

Thein Maung served as Minister of Commerce of the Coalition Government (1937–1939) led by Dr. Ba Maw, which is part of the 91 departments of administration. After Burma was occupied by the Empire of Japan, he served as finance minister in Dr. Ba Maw's government from 1942 to 1944. In 1944, he also served as the first Burmese ambassador to Japan in Tokyo.

The Thirty Comrades
Before the formation of the Burmese Army and Thirty Comrades, Thakin Mya, Thakin Kodaw Hmaing, Ba Lwin and others chose to lead Thakin Aung San to fight against the British in 1939. Colonel Suzuki Keiji arrived in Burma in May 1940 and met secretly with Maung, Hmaing, Mya, and Lwin in September. He helped Thakin Aung San and Thakin Hla Myaing to reach the Japanese military headquarters in Taipei (now Taiwan) from Amoi, and also helped them get to Japan via Taipei.

Japan-Burma Friendship Society Dr. Thein Maung arranged for communication between Thakin Aung San and Colonel Suzuki Keiji. He was the main supporter of the Thirty Comrades led by Thakin Aung San and their main facilitator for military training in Japan.

Because of his actions, many people say that "The beginning of the Thirty Comrades was Dr. Thein Maung".

Recognition
In February 1943, he visited Japan at the invitation of the Japanese government. He was awarded the Tat Naywun Order by Hirohito, the 124th emperor of Japan.

Personal life
Thein Maung married Daw Khin Khin Latt, the daughter of Min Htin Hla Kyaw Khaung, who was the Graduate Artillery Minister during the reign of King Thibaw Min. Together, they had a daughter, Daw Khin Thein.

Death
After the end of the Second World War and the surrender of the Japanese army, Allied forces arrested and imprisoned Maung at the Burmese Embassy in Sugamo Prison, Tokyo. He became sick in prison and was sent back to Burma. He died on the ship back on May 23, 1946.

References

1891 births
1946 deaths
Burmese politicians
Ambassadors of Myanmar to Japan
University of Yangon alumni
People from Pyay Region